Affordable Football Club Liverpool is a semi-professional football club based in Liverpool, England. The club were formed in 2008 by 1,000 supporters of Liverpool Football Club; a not-for-profit organisation, it is run on a one-member, one-vote system.

History
After plans were announced in February 2008, A.F.C Liverpool were established by Alun Parry in March 2008 for Liverpool fans who had been priced out of Premier League football, and who were unhappy with Liverpool F.C. being owned by American businessmen George Gillett and Tom Hicks, adopting the same colours as Liverpool. The new club applied to enter Division Two of the North West Counties League for the 2008–09 season, with their place in the now-renamed Division One confirmed in June. They also agreed a groundshare with Prescot Cables to play at Valerie Park. By mid-July the club had attracted around 1,000 members.

The club played their first match on 16 July, a friendly against St Helens Town at Ashton Town's Edge Street. In front of a crowd of around 600, the game ended in a 1–1 draw, with Martin Crowder scoring A.F.C. Liverpool's first-ever goal. The club's first league match on 9 August saw them beat Darwen 5–0. Their first season saw the club win the Division One Trophy with a 1–0 win over Padiham, whilst they finished fourth in the league, missing out on promotion by four points.

In 2009–10 the club finished fifth in Division One. They also played in the FA Vase for the first time, losing 2–1 at home to Dinnington Town in the second qualifying round. However, they retained the Division One Trophy. In 2010–11 the club entered the FA Cup for the first time, losing 4–1 at Hemsworth Miners Welfare in the extra-preliminary round. In the league they finished fourth, earning promotion to the Premier Division after Rossendale United were expelled from the league and third-placed Holker Old Boys declined promotion. However, they failed to retain the Division One Trophy, losing 3–2 after extra time in the final by Atherton Collieries.

In 2012–13 they reached the final of the Liverpool Senior Cup, losing 4–3 on penalties to Bootle after a 1–1 draw. Prior to the 2014–15 season the club announced that they would be leaving Valerie Park and playing at Rossett Park in Crosby. They reached the Liverpool Senior Cup final again in 2014–15, losing 5–4 to Skelmersdale United. The 2017–18 season saw the club finish in the relegation zone, resulting in relegation back to Division One. In 2021 the club were promoted to the Premier Division based on their results in the abandoned 2019–20 and 2020–21 seasons.

Season-by-season

Honours
North West Counties League
Division One Challenge Trophy winners 2008–09, 2009–10
Joe Fagan Commemorative Trophy
Winners 2008–09, 2009–10
The Fans Club Trophy
Winners 2008–09, 2009–10, 2010–11

Records
Best FA Cup performance: First qualifying round, 2015–16
Best FA Vase performance: Third round, 2010–11
Record attendance: 604 vs Wigan Robin Park, 6 September 2008 (at Valerie Park)
Biggest win: 9–0 vs St Helens Town, 13 September 2014
Heaviest defeat: 1–8 vs Winsford United, North West Counties League Premier Division 18 August 2012
Highest league position: 7th in the North West Counties League Premier Division, 2013–14
Lowest league position: 5th in North West Counties League Division One, 2009–10

See also
A.F.C. Liverpool players
List of fan-owned sports teams
F.C. United of Manchester
City of Liverpool F.C.

References

External links 
Official website

Football clubs in England
Fan-owned football clubs in England
AFC Liverpool
Association football clubs established in 2008
Football clubs in Liverpool
AFC Liverpool
2008 establishments in England
North West Counties Football League clubs